Marcelline is an unincorporated community in northwest Ursa Township, Adams County, Illinois, United States.

Marcelline is located on Illinois Route 96 four miles north of Ursa and five miles south of Lima. Bear Creek flows past approximately two miles to the north.

Demographics

References

Unincorporated communities in Adams County, Illinois
Unincorporated communities in Illinois